NGC 6362 is a globular cluster in the constellation Ara, lying close to Apus in the southern sky. A telescope with a 150mm primary mirror is required to resolve the stars within this irregularly shaped cluster. British astronomer James Dunlop first observed the cluster on 30 June 1826. It is located about 25,000 light-years from Earth and contains a number of blue stragglers.

Gallery

References

External links 
 

Ara (constellation)
Globular clusters
6362